Ernotte is a surname. Notable people with the surname include:

André Ernotte (1943–1999), Belgian film director and screenwriter
Delphine Ernotte (born 1966), French businesswoman